Pepa Hristova (born 25 April 1977) is a Bulgarian photographer, based in Hamburg and Berlin.

She has a degree in communication design with a specialization in photography from the Hamburg University of Applied Sciences and became a member of the Ostkreuz photographic agency in Berlin in 2006.

Hristova was born in Sevlievo, Bulgaria

Photography
Hristova's photographic work is driven by her fascination with the fractured beauty of the east and her interest in social phenomena and archaic traditions, leading to an examination of the unknown, changing side of Europe. She focuses on the alienation of Muslims in orthodox Bulgaria, documents a centuries-old custom in North Albania with ‘Sworn Virgins’ or looks behind the closed doors of Bulgarian children's homes. Hristova approaches her subjects with intuition and emotion and experiments with different genres and the ambiguity of photographic imagery. Snapshots combine with staged images and precise observations of situations, opening up an associative space, in which there is still scope for individual interpretations and points of contact.

Exhibitions (selected)
Stranger World Stadtmuseum Munich, FotoDoks, 2013

Books and catalogues
Strangers in Their Own Country. Berlin: Talents 11, 2008
24 Stunden Berlin. Göttingen: Steidl, 2009
The City. Becoming and decaying. Stuttgart: Hatje Cantz, 2010
The Other Side. Heidelberg: Kehrer, 2012
State of the Art Photography. Düsseldorf: Richter & Fey, 2012
On Borders. Stuttgart: Hatje Cantz, 2012
Sworn Virgins. Heidelberg: Kehrer, 2013.

References

External links

Pepa Hristova profile at Dear Photography
Pepa Hristova profile at Ostkreuz
CNN World – Albanian women choose celibacy to become men

1977 births
Living people
Bulgarian photographers
Portrait photographers
Documentary photographers
21st-century Bulgarian artists
Photographers from Hamburg
20th-century Bulgarian artists
20th-century German philosophers
Hamburg University of Applied Sciences alumni
People from Sevlievo
Women photojournalists